Bagneaux-sur-Loing is a railway station in Bagneaux-sur-Loing, Île-de-France, France. The station is on the Moret–Lyon railway. The station is served by the Transilien line R (Paris–Gare de Lyon) operated by SNCF.

See also
Transilien Paris–Lyon

References

External links

 

Railway stations in Seine-et-Marne